Åkra is a village in Kvinnherad municipality in Vestland county, Norway. The village sits in the far southeastern corner of the municipality. It sits at the end of Norwegian County Road 40, a road running from Dimmelsvik to Åkra where it ends. The village area is fairly isolated, with only one road in and out, sitting in a small valley with mountains and a fjord surrounding it.  Åkra Church is located in the village.

References

Villages in Vestland
Kvinnherad